The 2018 Basingstoke and Deane Borough Council election took place on 3 May 2018 to elect 20 members to Basingstoke and Deane Borough Council, as part of the wider local elections. The seats were last up for election in 2014. The councillor for Basing up for election this year, Onnalee Cubitt, had rejoined the Conservative Party prior to the election and held her seat as a Conservative.

Results 
The Conservative Party won a seat from the Liberal Democrats in Whitchurch, but themselves lost a seat in Winklebury to Labour. As a result, the number of Conservative seats was steady, with Labour having a net gain of one, and the Liberal Democrats a net loss of one. Independent councillor Ian Tiblury held the sole independent seat.

Results by Ward

Basing

Brighton Hill North

Brighton Hill South

Brookvale and Kings Furlong

Buckskin

Burghclere, Highclere and St Mary Bourne

Chineham

East Woodhay

Eastrop

Grove

Hatch Warren and Beggarwood

Kempshott

Norden

Oakley and North Waltham

Overton, Laverstoke and Steventon

Popley East

Popley West

South Ham

Whitchurch

Winklebury

References 

2018 English local elections
2018
2010s in Hampshire